Kilkenny is a city in Le Sueur County, Minnesota, United States. The population was 134 at the 2010 census.

It was named after the city and county of Kilkenny in Ireland.

Geography

Demographics

2010 census
As of the census of 2010, there were 134 people, 53 households, and 38 families living in the city. The racial makeup of the city was 99.3% White and 0.7% from other races. Hispanic or Latino of any race were 0.7% of the population.

There were 53 households, of which 41.5% had children under the age of 18 living with them, 52.8% were married couples living together, 9.4% had a female householder with no husband present, 9.4% had a male householder with no wife present, and 28.3% were non-families. 26.4% of all households were made up of individuals, and 15.1% had someone living alone who was 65 years of age or older. The average household size was 2.53 and the average family size was 3.00.

The median age in the city was 37.5 years. 27.6% of residents were under the age of 18; 10.5% were between the ages of 18 and 24; 20.9% were from 25 to 44; 29.1% were from 45 to 64; and 11.9% were 65 years of age or older. The gender makeup of the city was 52.2% male and 47.8% female.

2000 census
As of the census of 2000, there were 148 people, 59 households, and 40 families living in the city. The racial makeup of the city was 91.89% White, 2.03% Asian, 5.41% from other races, and 0.68% from two or more races. Hispanic or Latino of any race were 5.41% of the population.

There were 59 households, out of which 30.5% had children under the age of 18 living with them, 49.2% were married couples living together, 8.5% had a female householder with no husband present, and 32.2% were non-families. 28.8% of all households were made up of individuals, and 13.6% had someone living alone who was 65 years of age or older. The average household size was 2.51 and the average family size was 3.03.

In the city, the population was spread out, with 25.0% under the age of 18, 9.5% from 18 to 24, 30.4% from 25 to 44, 21.6% from 45 to 64, and 13.5% who were 65 years of age or older. The median age was 36 years. For every 100 females, there were 100.0 males. For every 100 females age 18 and over, there were 117.6 males.

The median income for a household in the city was $39,583, and the median income for a family was $42,188. Males had a median income of $34,500 versus $20,313 for females. The per capita income for the city was $16,198. There were none of the families and 3.6% of the population living below the poverty line, including no under eighteens and none of those over 64.

References

External links
Official website

Cities in Minnesota
Cities in Le Sueur County, Minnesota